Florida's 13th House District elects one member of the Florida House of Representatives. The district is represented by Tracie Davis. This district is located in Northeast Florida, and encompasses part of the First Coast, as well as the central part of the Jacksonville metropolitan area. The district covers central Duval County and Downtown Jacksonville, as well as the western half of the Arlington neighborhood. The district is located entirely within Jacksonville, though it only contains part of the city center. As of the 2010 Census, the district's population is 158,781. This district is majority-minority.

This district contains Florida State College at Jacksonville and Edward Waters College, located in Downtown Jacksonville, and Jacksonville University, located in the Arlington neighborhood.

There was a vacancy between November 4, 2014 and February 18, 2015. This vacancy occurred when incumbent Reggie Fullwood's reelection paperwork was rejected due to an error on his financial disclosure form. As he was the only candidate on the ballot, Florida Governor Rick Scott called for a special election to be held in February 2015. Fullwood won the special election to fill the seat.

There was a vacancy between October 3, 2016 and November 8, 2016 as the incumbent, Reggie Fullwood, resigned due after pleading guilty to wire fraud. Duval County Supervisor of Elections Tracie Davis won the general election to fill the seat.

Representatives from 1967 to the present

See also 

 Florida's 6th Senate district
 Florida's 4th congressional district
 Florida's 5th congressional district

References 

13
Duval County, Florida
Jacksonville, Florida